Hamartia is the tenth studio album by American extreme metal band Novembers Doom. The album was released on April 14, 2017 via The End Records. It marks the first time in the band's existence to have the same line up on two consecutive albums. Hamartia, in literature, is the flaw in character which leads to the downfall of the protagonist in a tragedy, particularly in ancient Greek ones.

Track listing

Personnel 
Novembers Doom
Paul Kuhr – vocals
Lawrence Roberts – guitars
Vito Marchese – guitars
Mike Feldman – bass guitar
Garry Naples – drums

Additional personnel
Ben Johnson – keyboards
Rhiannon Kuhr – additional vocals on tracks 4,7 and 8
Bernt Fjellestad – additional vocals
Eugen Poe – artwork
Dan Swanö – mastering, mixing, additional vocals
Chris Djuricic – digital editing, engineering, producing
Roanna Zoe – photography

References

2017 albums
The End Records albums
Progressive metal albums by American artists
Gothic metal albums by American artists
Novembers Doom albums